Songe, also known as Songye, Kisonge, Lusonge, Yembe, and Northeast Luba, is a Bantu language spoken in the Democratic Republic of the Congo.

Ethnologue notes that Songe is "related" to Mbagani, which they do not include in their database. Maho (2009) labels as "Mbagani (Binji)" one of the two geographic areas Ethnologue assigns to Songe, but says that it is closer to Lwalu; he says that it is a different language, Binji, that is close to Songe.

Phonology

Vowels 
A five vowel system with vowel length is present:

Consonants 

 Palatalization [ʲ] and labialization [ʷ] is also present among consonant sounds.

References

Luban languages
Languages of the Democratic Republic of the Congo